Eugène Charles Choisel (15 September 1881 in Asnières-sur-Seine – 1 February 1946 in Paris) was a French track and field athlete who competed at the 1900 Summer Olympics in Paris, France. He placed fourth in the 200 metre hurdles. Choisel also competed in the 110 metre hurdles. He placed third in his first-round (semifinals) heat and did not advance to the final.

References

Sources
 De Wael, Herman. Herman's Full Olympians: "Athletics 1900". Accessed 18 March 2006.
 
Eugène Choisel's profile at Sports Reference.com

External links
 

Athletes (track and field) at the 1900 Summer Olympics
Olympic athletes of France
French male hurdlers
1881 births
1946 deaths
People from Asnières-sur-Seine
Sportspeople from Hauts-de-Seine